The Man of Action (German: Der Mann der Tat) is a 1919 German silent film directed by Victor Janson and starring Emil Jannings, Hanna Ralph and Hermann Böttcher.

The film's sets were designed by the art director Kurt Richter.

Cast
Emil Jannings as Jan Miller 
Hanna Ralph as Henrica van Looy 
Hermann Böttcher

References

External links

Films of the Weimar Republic
Films directed by Victor Janson
German silent feature films
German black-and-white films
UFA GmbH films